GreenTech Automotive (GTA) was a U.S.-based automotive manufacturer dedicated to developing and producing 100% electric vehicles. It was a subsidiary of WM Industries Corp.

History

GTA was founded in 2009 by Charles Wang. In May 2010, GTA acquired Hong Kong based EuAuto Technology and its Mycar vehicle, and relocated the company's operations and manufacturing to the United States. GTA's first manufacturing facility was temporarily in Horn Lake, Mississippi.

The company merged with VL Automotive in 2014, developing a traditionally powered version of the Fisker Karma, called the WM Destino.

In September 2014, GTA completed construction on a new production facility in Tunica County, Mississippi. This was shut down in January 2017. 

The company declared bankruptcy in February 2018.

Products
 GTA Mycar, a 2-door, 2-seater Neighborhood Electric Vehicle designed in 2003 by Giorgetto Giugiaro, and developed by EuAuto Technology

References

Green cars
Defunct motor vehicle manufacturers of the United States